A list of books for the Paranoia role-playing game, with their ISBN numbers.

First edition

Second edition

Fifth edition

Paranoia XP

25th Anniversary Edition

Red Clearance Edition

Other Game Products

Fiction

Novels
 
 
 (A Paranoia/Torg crossover novel)

Comics

References

Paranoia
Paranoia
Paranoia (role-playing game)
Science fiction role-playing game supplements